The Military Revolutionary Committee was the name for military organs created by the Bolsheviks under the soviets in preparation for the October Revolution (October 1917 – March 1918). The committees were powerful directing bodies of revolt, installing and securing the Soviet power. They executed a role of provisional extraordinary organs the Bolshevik power.

The most notable ones were those of the Petrograd Soviet, the Moscow Soviet, and at Stavka.

Creation

The idea for organization of the armed revolt battle center belongs to Vladimir Lenin. In his letter "Marxism and Revolt" directed to the Central Committee of RSDLP (b) in September 1917, he put on the agenda the task of preparing an armed uprising, writing:

The decision of Central Committee of RSDLP(b) of October 23 and 29, 1917 on enhanced preparation for the armed revolt hastened the creation of uprising bodies at central and local levels. The MRC were elected from representatives of the Bolsheviks' party, soviets, factory or soldier committees, Bolshevik Military Organizations (Voyenka), Red Guards, and others. The committees were of various levels such as gubernial, city, county, district, volost; while in the Army were frontlines, army, corps, division, and regimental. On occasions the functions of the Military Revolutionary Committee were performed by revolutionary committees. The military revolutionary committees were not uniform in terms of their social and party composition, however most of them were predominantly represented by Bolsheviks.

The first headquarters of armed uprising became the Petrograd Military Revolutionary Committee, that was created by the Petrograd Soviet on October 25, 1917. Prior to a victorious moment of the uprising in Petrograd there were over 40 Military Revolutionary Committees in the country, the main activity of which was military and technical preparations for the forthcoming revolt.

List of military revolutionary committees
During the "Triumphant advance of Soviet power" there was a mass establishment of MRCs. Many MRCs appeared on initiative of the arrived delegates of the 2nd All-Russian Congress of Soviets. Big squad of commissars, emissaries, agitators was sent to various country's regions by the Petrograd MRC on direction of the Central Committee of RSDLP(b). The Bolshevik's party composed the committees of experienced organizers.

Influence
In the weeks following the October insurrection, military revolutionary committees based on the MRC of Petrograd were set up throughout the other soviets and helped cement Bolshevik control.  These other MRCs were formed by locals but agents from the Petrograd MRC were often in positions to give advice or direction.  By the end of October 1917, representatives from the Petrograd MRC were on assignments in at least forty-four cities as well as 113 military units throughout Russia, Turkestan, and the Caucasus.

See also
 Revolutionary Military Council

References

Further reading
Resis, Albert (July 1977).  Lenin on Freedom of the Press.  Russian Review, Vol. 36, No. 3, pp. 274–296.
Rigby, T.H. (Jan. 1974). The First Proletarian Government. British Journal of Political Science, Vol. 4, No. 1, pp. 37–51.
Utechin, S.V.  (Oct. 1958).  Bolsheviks and Their Allies after 1917:  The Ideological Pattern.  Soviet Studies, Vol. 10, No. 2, pp. 113–135.
Lenin, V.I. Marxism and Revolt. Full collection of articles (Марксизм и восстание, Полн. собр. соч.). Ed. 5. Vol. 34
Questionnaires of councils of the Central Industrial district (October 1917 – January 1918). "Historical Archives". 1960

Bolshevik uprisings